Eduardo Gordon Cañas (1918 − 8 November 2001) was a Chilean police officer and football leader who served as president of the Chilean Football Association, then called Asociación Central del Fútbol (ACF).

Biography
During his period as president of the ACF, it was created many clubs in bordering zones of Chile for geopolitical reasons, with the goal to generate a sense of belonging, especially in front of Peru and Bolivia. On that way, it was established Cobreloa (1978), Deportes Iquique (1979) or Cobresal (1979).

In 1979, after a signature forgery scandal related to the Chile U-20 team, Gordon lost the ANFP elections to Abel Alonso, and, immediately afterward, Augusto Pinochet appointed him ambassador to Nicaragua.

References

Further reading

External links
 Profile at Annales de la República

1918 births
2001 deaths
Chilean people
Presidents of the ANFP
Chilean anti-communists